is a Japanese professional wrestler and mixed martial artist, primarily working for Big Japan Pro Wrestling (BJW) in the Deathmatch division. Takeda also competes as a freelancer for Freedoms and occasionally, All Japan Pro Wrestling (AJPW).

Early life

While in junior high school, Takeda discovered deathmatch wrestling and mixed martial arts, becoming a huge fan of both. After graduating from high school, he enrolled in the U-File Camp, training for a career in MMA. After receiving some pro wrestling training from Jun Kasai, Takeda debuted as a wrestler for Style-E in January 2007.

Professional wrestling career

Big Japan Pro Wrestling (2008–present)

Takeda debuted in BJW on May 23, 2008, teaming with Kankuro Hoshino in a loss to Craig Classic and Masada. In October of that year, he competed in his first ever deathmatch, teaming with Shuji Ishikawa and Ryuji Ito in a loss to Saboru Inematsu, Jaki Numazawa and mentor Jun Kasai. In early 2009, Takeda teamed with Isami Kodaka in the Maximum Tag League, winning his first deathmatch on March 26, when he and Kodaka defeated Numazawa and Kasai. The two finished first in their block with 6 points, allowing them to advance to the semi-finals where they defeated Block A runners-up Ryuji Ito and Shuji Ishikawa. In the final, Takeda and Kodaka wrestled Takashi Sasaki and Yuko Miyamoto to a draw in a Fluorescent Lighttubes Tower Of Death Match, but defeated them in overtime to become the new BJW Tag Team Champions. Takeda and Kodaka held the championships until July, dropping them to Daisuke Sekimoto and Yuji Okabayashi in their first defence. That same month, Takeda won the D-Dash Tournament, defeating Shinya Ishikawa in the final, and unsuccessfully challenged Yuko Miyamoto for the BJW Deathmatch Heavyweight Championship in a scaffold deathmatch. In December, Takeda teamed with Takuma Obe in the D-Dash Tag Tournament, making it to the semi-finals before being eliminated by Ryuichi Kawakami and Shinya Ishikawa. Takeda again challenged for the Deathmatch Heavyweight Championship in July 2010, this time losing to Ryuji Ito in a glass and fluorescent light tubes alpha deathmatch.

In early 2011, Takeda participated in the Ikkitosen Death Survival Tournament, finishing first in his block with 6 points, but losing to Takashi Sasaki in the final. Takeda received his third opportunity at the BJW Deathmatch Heavyweight Championship in February 2012, losing to Abdullah Kobayashi in an Open Finger Gloves Spike Nail Deathmatch. Takeda made his debut outside of Japan in June 2013, losing to Combat Zone Wrestling (CZW)'s Drake Younger in a deathmatch in Germany. Takeda unsuccessfully challenged for the BJW Deathmatch Heavyweight Championship for the fourth time on June 30, losing to Shuji Ishikawa. In February 2014, while riding his motorcycle, Takeda was involved in an accident, injuring his ankle and missing 4 months of action. He wrestled his return match on June 14, losing to Danny Havoc in the first round of the 2014 Tournament Of Death for CZW in the United States. Takeda received his 5th opportunity at the Deathmatch Heavyweight Championship in August, losing to Yuko Miyamoto. In early 2015, Takeda again participated in the Ikkitosen Survival Tournament, finishing first in his block with 8 points but losing to Abdullah Kobayashi in the final. On August 19, 2017, Takeda defeated Masaya Takahashi to win the BJW Deathmatch Heavyweight Championship for the first time in his career.

All Japan Pro Wrestling (2016–present)

Beginning in May 2016, Takeda began making appearances for All Japan Pro Wrestling (AJPW). On May 25, Takeda unsuccessfully challenged Atsushi Aoki for the World Junior Heavyweight Championship. In August, Takeda gained his biggest win in All Japan to date when he teamed with Nextream (Jake Lee and Kento Miyahara) to defeat Evolution (Suwama and Aoki) and Super Tiger. On October 15, Takeda and Atsushi Maruyama unsuccessfully challenged Evolution (Aoki and Hikaru Sato) for the All Asia Tag Team Championship.

Personal life 

Takeda is a birdkeeper in his spare time; he owns a pet barn owl named 12, and runs a Twitter account where he posts pictures and updates of the owl. 

He married his wife, Yuka Omori, a former member of the idol group "Through Skills" in June 2019. Together, the couple had a daughter. Takeda announced on January 30, 2022 that his wife had passed away suddenly on January 7, and her funeral had been held on January 14. He also announced that he would be taking a break from professional wrestling as a result. He eventually returned to the ring in July 2022.

Mixed martial arts record

Championships and accomplishments
All Japan Pro Wrestling
Jr. Tag Battle of Glory (2017) – with Atsushi Maruyama
Big Japan Pro Wrestling
BJW Deathmatch Heavyweight Championship (1 time)
BJW World Tag Team Championship (1 time) – with Isami Kodaka
Saikyo Tag League (2009) – with Isami Kodaka
Dotonbori Pro Wrestling
WDW Tag Team Championship (1 time) – with Jaki Numazawa
Desastre Total Ultraviolento
DTU World Extreme Championship (1 time)
Guts World Pro Wrestling
GWC 6-Man Tag Team Championship (3 times) – with Masato Shibata and Kotaro Nasu (1), Daisuke and Kankuro Hoshino (1) and Daisuke and Bungee Takada (1)
Game Changer Wrestling
GCW Ultraviolent Championship (1 time)
GCW Nick Gage Invitational 3 
Japan Indie Awards
Best Bout Award (2017) vs. Masaya Takahashi on December 17
Pro Wrestling A-Team
WEW Tag Team Championship (1 time) – with Tomohiko Hashimoto
Pro Wrestling Freedoms
King of Freedom World Championship (2 times)
King of Freedom Tag Team Championship (1 time)
Jun Kasai Deathmatch Tournament (2013)
Pro Wrestling Zero1
Intercontinental Tag Team Championship (1 time) – with Yuko Miyamoto
Style-E
Style-E Openweight Championship (1 time)

References

Japanese male professional wrestlers
Living people
1985 births
Japanese male mixed martial artists
Mixed martial artists utilizing wrestling
21st-century professional wrestlers
WEW World Tag Team Champions
BJW Deathmatch Heavyweight Champions
BJW Tag Team Champions